The Cabin Run Covered Bridge is a historic covered bridge located in Point Pleasant, Plumstead Township, Bucks County, Pennsylvania. The Town truss bridge crosses the Cabin Run (creek) downstream from the Loux Covered Bridge.

It was added to the National Register of Historic Places on December 1, 1980.

See also
National Register of Historic Places listings in Bucks County, Pennsylvania
List of bridges documented by the Historic American Engineering Record in Pennsylvania
List of bridges on the National Register of Historic Places in Pennsylvania

References

External links

Historic American Engineering Record in Pennsylvania
Bridges completed in 1871
Covered bridges in Bucks County, Pennsylvania
Covered bridges on the National Register of Historic Places in Pennsylvania
Bridges in Bucks County, Pennsylvania
Tourist attractions in Bucks County, Pennsylvania
National Register of Historic Places in Bucks County, Pennsylvania
Road bridges on the National Register of Historic Places in Pennsylvania
Wooden bridges in Pennsylvania
Lattice truss bridges in the United States